BD1008 or N-[2-(3,4-dichlorophenyl)ethyl]-N-methyl-1-pyrrolidineethanamine is a selective sigma receptor antagonist, with a reported binding affinity of Ki = 2 ± 1 nM for the sigma-1 receptor and 4 times selectivity over the sigma-2 receptor.

Consistent with other reported sigma receptor antagonists, pretreating Swiss Webster mice with BD1008 significantly attenuates the behavioral toxicity of cocaine, and may be potentially useful in the development of antidotes for the treatment of cocaine overdose.

See also
 BD1031
 LR132

References

Pyrrolidines
Chloroarenes